Events in the year 2017 in Serbia.

Incumbents 
 President: Tomislav Nikolić
 Prime Minister: Aleksandar Vučić

Events
2 April – Scheduled date for the Serbian presidential election, 2017

Deaths

4 January – Vlastimir Trajković, composer (b. 1947).
8 January – Jovanka Nikolić, writer (b. 1952).
23 January – Boško Krunić, politician (b. 1929).

References

 
2010s in Serbia
Years of the 21st century in Serbia
Serbia
Serbia